WASP-76b is a Hot Jupiter exoplanet orbiting the star WASP-76 in the constellation Pisces. Wasp-76b orbits its parent star at a distance of 0.033 AU in a time period of 1.8 days. Its mass is 0.92 times that of Jupiter. WASP-76b was discovered on October 21, 2013 and is the only known planet in the WASP-76 system as of 2022.

Atmospheric composition
Data from the Hubble and Spitzer Space Telescopes indicates the presence of titanium oxide and traces of water inside the planet's atmosphere. Higher-resolution spectra have featured ionized Lithium (Li), Sodium (Na), magnesium (Mg), calcium (Ca), manganese (Mn), potassium (K), and iron (Fe). The presence of calcium (Ca) was confirmed in 2021 by the Gemini North Observatory. In 2022, the element barium (Ba) was also detected.

The atmosphere of WASP-76b is cloudy and primarily grey, with a significant amount of thermal incandescence.

Iron rain 
In March of 2020, initial spectroscopic findings indicated the presence of neutral iron.

In May 2020, the Hubble Space Telescope discovered that the light from a stellar companion distorted the previous spectrum of WASP-76b. Using data from a current, up-to-date spectrum, an updated atmospheric model was produced; cloudy hydrogen-helium envelope, non-detection of previously reported neutral iron (including "iron rain"), and only upper limits on oxides of titanium and vanadium. By 2021, the controversy was resolved by demonstrating that the tentative iron condensation signal may also appear due to the temperature asymmetry between leading and trailing limbs. However, existing data does not allow distinguishing between the two scenarios.

Planetary atmospheric circulation models for WASP-76b suggest dense cloud layers formed of aluminum oxide, neutral iron, or magnesium orthosilicate, but no significant night side condensation of iron.

See also
WASP-7b
WASP-12b
WASP-121b

References

Exoplanets discovered by WASP
Hot Jupiters
Giant planets
Exoplanets discovered in 2013